Philippe Lincourt-Joseph (born November 1, 1994) is a Canadian professional soccer player who plays as a midfielder.

Early life
Lincourt-Joseph was born in Laval, Canada, a suburb of Montreal. At youth level, he played for Montreal-area clubs Les Étoiles de L'Est, CS Chomedey, CS Monteuil and FC Boisbriand before joining Montreal Impact Academy in 2012.

Club career

Montreal Impact
Lincourt-Joseph played with the Montreal Impact Academy in the Canadian Soccer League from 2012 to 2014.  He also played in the Premier Development League for Montreal Impact U23.

FC Montreal
On March 13, 2015, it was announced that Lincourt-Joseph would join FC Montreal, a USL affiliate club of the Montreal Impact for their inaugural season.  He made his professional debut for the club on March 28 in a 2–0 defeat to Toronto FC II.

Fátima
In 2017, Lincourt-Joseph signed with Portuguese third division club C.D. Fátima.

Al-Rustaq
In July 2018, Lincourt-Joseph signed with Oman Professional League club Al-Rustaq SC.

FC Edmonton
On 26 February 2019, Lincourt-Joseph signed with Canadian Premier League side FC Edmonton. At the end of the season Edmonton announced he would not be returning to the team for the 2020 season.

References

External links
USSF Development Academy bio

1994 births
Living people
Association football midfielders
Canadian soccer players
Soccer people from Quebec
Sportspeople from Laval, Quebec
Canadian sportspeople of Guyanese descent
Canadian expatriate soccer players
Expatriate footballers in Portugal
Canadian expatriate sportspeople in Portugal
Expatriate footballers in Oman
Canadian expatriate sportspeople in Oman
Montreal Impact U23 players
FC Montreal players
C.D. Fátima players
FC Edmonton players
Canadian Soccer League (1998–present) players
USL League Two players
USL Championship players
Campeonato de Portugal (league) players
Oman Professional League players
Canadian Premier League players
FC Boisbriand players
CS Monteuil players